A nutlet is a small nut.

Nutlet may also refer to:
Pyrena or nutlet, a seed covered by a stony layer
Nutlet or Oreshek, another name for Shlisselburg Fortress, Russia